Theodora Dupree Richards (born March 18, 1985) is an American model and the daughter of Patti Hansen and Rolling Stones guitarist Keith Richards, and the elder sister of Alexandra Richards.

Career
At 16, Richards, her sister Alexandra, and Elizabeth Jagger (daughter of rock star Mick Jagger) were asked to model for a Tommy Hilfiger campaign. She has guest-edited one issue of L'Officiel. In 2006, Richards modeled for the New Zealand-based Karen Walker label. In mid-2006, she appeared on the cover of Lucire, shot by Barry Hollywood. In 2011, she appeared on the cover of Town & Country with her mother and sister.

Richards also broadcasts a monthly show on Sirius XM called Off The Cuff.

References

External links

1985 births
Living people
American female models
People from Fairfield County, Connecticut
American people of English descent
American people of Welsh descent
American people of Norwegian descent
Models from New York City
Keith Richards